Impur is a town and an assembly constituency in Nagaland, India. It was established as a mission centre in 1894 by the American missionaries. In 1897, when the Ao Baptist Arogo Mungdang (Ao Baptist Church Association) was formed, it became its headquarters and continues to do so till date. It is 15 kilometres away from the heart of Mokokchung town. It is also the Headquarters of Ao churches (ABAM) in Nagaland which has about 159 churches under its fold. It has a Higher Secondary school, Hospital and a Church. It is surrounded by Mopongchuket and Süngratsü village.

References 

Cities and towns in Mokokchung district